Poley, also known as Poley Bayou, is an unincorporated community in Livingston Parish, Louisiana, United States.

History
An early settler named Calvin Doris Bowman scouted the area sometime in the 1830s and exclaimed to his companions, "This is just about the poliest place I ever saw." and that was the name given to the area. A post office was built here on December 31, 1909, and a man named Martin L. Bowman was appointed as the first postmaster.

References

Unincorporated communities in Livingston Parish, Louisiana
Unincorporated communities in Louisiana